European route E36 is a west to east intermediate-category European route connecting Berlin in Germany with Bolesławiec in Poland.

Important towns served by the E36 include:

Germany
Berlin
Lübben
Lübbenau
Cottbus
Forst (Lausitz)

Poland
Żary
Iłowa
Bolesławiec

At Bolesławiec the E36 joins the much longer E40 route which, originating at Calais in France, runs for more than  via Kraków and Lviv to Ridder in Kazakhstan, on the western border of China.

Route 
 
 : Berlin
 : Berlin – Lübben – Lübbenau
 : Lübbenau – Cottbus – Forst (Lausitz)
 
 : Olszyna – Żary – Iłowa – Golnice
 : Golnice – Bolesławiec

External links 
 UN Economic Commission for Europe: Overall Map of E-road Network (2007)

36
036
E036